Association Sportive de Saint-Étienne Loire, commonly known as A.S.S.E. or simply Saint-Étienne, is a professional football club based in Saint-Étienne in Auvergne-Rhône-Alpes, France. The club was founded in 1933 and competes in Ligue 2, the second division of French football.

Saint-Étienne plays its home matches at the Stade Geoffroy-Guichard.

Saint-Étienne have won a joint-record of ten Ligue 1 titles, as well as six Coupe de France titles, a Coupe de la Ligue title and five Trophée des Champions. Saint-Étienne has also won the Ligue 2 championship on three occasions. The club achieved most of its honours in the 1960s and 1970s when the club was led by managers Jean Snella, Albert Batteux, and Robert Herbin.

Saint-Étienne is known as Les Verts meaning "the Greens" due to its home colours. The club's primary rivals are Olympique Lyonnais, based in nearby Lyon, with whom they contest the Derby Rhône-Alpes. In 2009, the club added a female section.

History

Early history
AS Saint-Étienne was founded in 1919 by employees of the Saint-Étienne-based grocery store chain Groupe Casino under the name Amicale des Employés de la Société des Magasins Casino (ASC). The club adopted green as its primary color mainly due to it being the principal colour of Groupe Casino. In 1920, due to the French Football Federation (FFF) prohibiting the use of trademarks in sports club, the club dropped "Casino" from its name and changed its name to simply Amical Sporting Club to retain the ASC acronym. In 1927, Pierre Guichard took over as president of the club and, after merging with local club Stade Forézien Universitaire, changed its name to Association sportive Stéphanoise.

In July 1930, the National Council of the FFF voted 128–20 in support of professionalism in French football. In 1933, Stéphanoise turned professional and changed its name to its current version. The club was inserted into the second division and became inaugural members of the league after finishing runner-up in the South Group. Saint-Étienne remained in Division 2 for four more seasons before earning promotion to Division 1 for the 1938–39 season under the leadership of the Englishman Teddy Duckworth. However, the team's debut appearance in the first division was short-lived due to the onset of World War II. Saint-Étienne returned to the first division after the war under the Austrian-born Frenchman Ignace Tax and surprised many by finishing runner-up to Lille in the first season after the war. The club failed to improve upon that finish in following seasons under Tax and, ahead of the 1950–51 season, Tax was let go and replaced by former Saint-Étienne player Jean Snella.

Ten league titles (1956–1981)

Under Snella, Saint-Étienne achieved its first honour after winning the Coupe Charles Drago in 1955. Two seasons later, the club won its first domestic league title. Led by goalkeeper Claude Abbes, defender Robert Herbin, as well as midfielders René Ferrier and Kees Rijvers and striker Georges Peyroche, Saint-Étienne won the league by four points over Lens. In 1958, Saint-Étienne won the Coupe Drago for the second time. After the following season, in which the club finished sixth, Snella departed the club. He was replaced by René Vernier. In the team's first season under Vernier, Saint-Étienne finished 12th, the club's worst finish since finishing 11th eight seasons ago. In the following season, François Wicart joined the coaching staff. In 1961, Roger Rocher became president of the club and quickly became one of the club's chief investors. After two seasons under Wicart, Saint-Étienne were relegated after finishing 17th in the 1961–62 season. However, Wicart did lead the club to its first Coupe de France title in 1962, alongside co-manager Henri Guérin with the team defeating FC Nancy 1–0 in the final. He also led the club back to Division 1 after one season in the second division, but after the season, Wicart was replaced by Snella, who returned as manager after a successful stint in Switzerland with Servette.

In Snella's first season back, Saint-Étienne won its second league title and, three seasons later, captured its third. Snella's third and final title with the club coincided with the arrival of Georges Bereta, Bernard Bosquier, Gérard Farison and Hervé Revelli to the team. After the season, Snella returned to Servette and former Stade de Reims manager Albert Batteux replaced him. In Batteux's first season in 1967–68, Saint-Étienne captured the double after winning the league and the Coupe de France. In the next season, Batteux won the league and, in the ensuing season, won the double again. The club's fast rise into French football led to a high-level of confidence from the club's ownership and supporters and, following two seasons without a trophy, Batteux was let go and replaced by former Saint-Étienne player Robert Herbin.

In Herbin's first season in charge, Saint-Étienne finished fourth in the league and reached the semi-finals of the Coupe de France. In the next two seasons, the club won the double, its seventh and eighth career league title and its third and fourth Coupe de France title. In 1976, Saint-Étienne became the first French club since Reims in 1959 to reach the final of the European Cup. In the match, played at Hampden Park in Scotland, Saint-Étienne faced German club Bayern Munich, who were the reigning champions and arguably the world's best team at the time. The match was hotly contested with Saint-Étienne failing to score after numerous chances by Jacques Santini, Dominique Bathenay and Osvaldo Piazza, among others. A single goal by Franz Roth eventually decided the outcome and Saint-Étienne supporters departed Scotland in tears, however, not without nicknaming the goalposts "les poteaux carrés" ("the square posts"). Saint-Étienne did earn a consolation prize by winning the league to cap off a successful season and, in the following season, the team won the Coupe de France. In 1981, Saint-Étienne, captained by Michel Platini, won its final league title to date after winning the league for the tenth time. After two more seasons in charge, Herbin departed the club for archrivals Lyon.

Decline and recent history

In 1982, a financial scandal involving a controversial slush fund led to the departure and eventual jailing of long-time president Roger Rocher. Saint-Étienne subsequently suffered a free-fall with the club suffering relegation in the 1983–84 season. The club returned to the first division in 1986 under the leadership of goalkeeper Jean Castaneda who had remained with the club, despite its financial state. Saint-Étienne kept its place in the first division for nearly a decade with the club reaching the semi-finals of the Coupe de France in 1990 and 1993 during the stint. In 1996, Saint-Étienne was relegated to the second division and returned to Division 1 in 1999. In the 2000–01 season, the club was supervised by five different managers and had to deal with a scandal that involved two players (Brazilian Alex Dias and Ukrainian goalkeeper Maksym Levytsky) who utilised fake Portuguese and Greek passports. Both players were suspended for four months and, at the end of a judicial inquiry, which linked some of the club's management staff to the passport forgeries, Saint-Étienne was docked seven league points and relegated.

Saint-Étienne played three seasons in the second division and returned to the first division, now called Ligue 1, for the 2004–05 season. They came fifth in the 2007–08 season, which resulted in the club qualifying for the UEFA Cup for the first time since 1982. Saint-Étienne was influenced by several youngsters within the team such as Bafétimbi Gomis, Loïc Perrin, Blaise Matuidi and Dimitri Payet. The club followed up its fifth-place finish by finishing 17th in the next two seasons.

Having won the Coupe de la Ligue in April 2013, their first major domestic trophy for more than 30 years, Saint-Étienne qualified for the third preliminary round of the 2013–14 UEFA Europa League campaign. Following crowd trouble towards the end of the 2012–13 season, Saint-Étienne were handed a one-match stadium ban which would have forced the team to open their campaign behind closed doors. However, on 23 July 2013, this ban was lifted. On 30 November 2014, Saint-Etienne defeated fierce rivals Olympique Lyonnais 3–0 at the Stade Geoffroy-Guichard for the first time since 1994.

The 2017–18 Ligue 1 season started badly for Saint-Etienne and culminated in a 5–0 derby loss to  Olympique Lyonnais, after which Óscar García Junyent was dismissed as manager and replaced by former player Julien Sablé. Sable was replaced in December by Jean-Louis Gasset because he did not hold the required qualifications to coach in Ligue 1, and the club were fined €25,000 euros for every game played with Sable in charge. Under Gasset, Saint-Etienne went 13 games unbeaten and finished 7th in the table at the end of the season.

In the 2018–19 season, Saint-Etienne came fourth, the best finish since their promotion, after which Gasset elected to leave the club. The following year they were 17th when the season was ended by the coronavirus pandemic. They also reached the Coupe de France final in this season, which they lost 1–0 to Paris Saint-Germain.

In the 2020–21 season, Saint-Etienne started poorly and hovered above the relegation zone for most of the season before winning five of their last ten matches to finish 11th on the table. During that season, the club's board of directors announced, in a public letter on 14 April 2021, that the club was up for sale.

During the beginning of the 2021–22, the team suffered a catastrophic record; the culmination of 12 consecutive games without a win in Ligue 1. On 5 December 2021, after a 5–0 defeat against Rennes, manager Claude Puel was relieved from his duties. Julien Sablé, the assistant coach, took over as caretaker manager, before Pascal Dupraz was appointed as the new manager on 15 December 2021. The team eventually finished 18th in the season, and were relegated to the Ligue 2 after losing in a penalty shootout to Auxerre in the relegation play-offs. Saint-Etienne was sanctioned with a deduction of three points and four matches being closed doors after serious incidents that occurred on the field after the game. 

With a total of 18 points at the half of the 2022-23 season, Saint Etienne was in the relegation zone ranked 18th in the table.

Players

Current squad 
As of 1 February 2023.

Out on loan

Other players under contract

Retired numbers

Records and statistics 

Most appearances

Top scorers

European record
As of 2019

UEFA club coefficient ranking

Honours

Domestic
 Ligue 1
 Champions (10) Joint-Record: 1956–57, 1963–64, 1966–67, 1967–68, 1968–69, 1969–70, 1973–74, 1974–75, 1975–76, 1980–81
 Runners-up: 1945-46, 1971-72, 1981-82
 Ligue 2
 Winners (3): 1962–63, 1998–99, 2003–04
 Coupe de France
 Winners (6): 1961–62, 1967–68, 1969–70, 1973–74, 1974–75, 1976–77
 Coupe de la Ligue
 Winners: 2012–13
 Trophée des Champions
 Winners (5): 1957, 1962, 1967, 1968, 1969
 Coupe Charles Drago
 Winners: 1955, 1958

European
 European Cup/Champions League
 Runners-up (1): 1975–76

Youth
 Coupe Gambardella
 Winners: 1962–63, 1969–70, 1987–88, 2018–19

Management and staff

Club officials 
Senior club staff
President: Bernard Caiazzo 
Vice-President: Roland Romeyer
General manager: Xavier Thuilot

Coaching and medical staff
Head coach: Laurent Batlles
Assistant coach: Julien Sablé

Academy coaching staff
Director of Youth Academy: Bernard David

Coaching history

References

External links 

 

 
1933 establishments in France
Association football clubs established in 1933
Sport in Saint-Étienne
Football clubs in Auvergne-Rhône-Alpes